National Religious Broadcasters (NRB) is an international association of evangelical communicators. While theologically diverse within the evangelical community, NRB members are linked through a Declaration of Unity that proclaims their joint commitment and devotion to Christianity.

History

In the early 1940s in America, the emerging culture of hostility between mainline Protestant denominations and the rapidly growing evangelical Protestant movement reached a crisis phase in the world of radio broadcasting. Protestant denominational leaders argued for regulations that would restrict access to the radio broadcast spectrum. They claimed independent Evangelical preachers who were unaccountable to any denominational entity could not be trusted with the public airwaves.

In those early years of radio broadcasting, pioneer Evangelical broadcasters like William Ward Ayer, Paul Rader, Donald Grey Barnhouse, Walter Maier, and Charles Fuller had built radio audiences in the millions and were faithfully proclaiming the Gospel of Jesus Christ. By 1942, the Mutual Broadcasting System received more than 25% of its total revenue from religious broadcasters.

Yet in 1943, the Federal Council of Churches (later renamed the National Council of Churches) supported proposed regulations that would have resulted in every Evangelical broadcaster being taken off the national radio networks. They demanded that religious broadcasting should only be aired as a public service during free or "sustaining" time donated by the radio networks. They further argued that these public service slots should only be allocated to "responsible" religious broadcasters that had been approved by local and national denominational councils – like themselves.

The Federal Council of Churches persuaded all three national radio networks – NBC, CBS, and the Mutual Broadcasting System – to adopt the proposed regulations. Subsequently, every Evangelical Christian broadcaster was taken off the national radio networks, with their only access being small independent stations with a very limited audience.

In response to this challenge, 150 Evangelical Christian broadcasters and church leaders held a series of meetings which led to the formation of the National Religious Broadcasters (NRB). In the fall of 1944, members of the NRB adopted their Constitution, Bylaws, Statement of Faith, and Code of Ethics. And thus began a multi-year effort by NRB to build credibility for Evangelical broadcasters, to secure available public interest slots, and to overturn the ban on the purchase of radio airtime for religious broadcasting.

In 1949 the newly formed ABC radio network reversed the ban on paid religious broadcasting, with the other networks following their lead. In a few years, Evangelical radio broadcasters were again on major radio networks with scores of new programs.

The NRB now operates in a more complex electronic media environment, while retaining its original focus of defending and expanding access to electronic media platforms for Christian evangelism. And the audience for religious broadcasters has expanded, with 141 million Americans using Christian media at least once per month.

Membership

Members of the association are required to ascribe to the Statement of Faith and adhere to the NRB Code of Ethics. NRB members must also meet the  Standards of Financial Accountability set forth by the Evangelical Council for Financial Accountability (ECFA).

Governance
NRB members elect a Board of Directors and five Officers for the association. The five Officers, along with five Members-At-Large elected from the Board of Directors, form an Executive Committee that governs the association.

Controversy
On 27 August 2021 NRB fired its senior vice president of communications, Daniel Darling, because he expressed support for the use of vaccines to fight the COVID-19 pandemic.  This was done in the midst of a precipitous rise in COVID-19 deaths blamed largely on low vaccination rates against the disease.

References

External links

Television networks in the United States
Religious television stations in the United States
Television organizations in the United States
Radio organizations in the United States
1944 establishments in Virginia
Organizations established in 1944
International Christian organizations
Evangelicalism in the United States